Boma International Airport  is an airport serving the city of Boma in Kongo Central Province, Democratic Republic of the Congo.

See also

 List of airports in the Democratic Republic of the Congo

References

External links
 HERE/Nokia Maps - Lukandu

Airports in Kongo Central Province